The National Tuberculosis Institute (acronym NTIB) is a Government of India institute, under the Directorate General of Health Services, Ministry of Health and Family Welfare, dedicated to advanced research on Tuberculosis. The Institute is located along Bellary Road, in Bengaluru, Karnataka state, India.

Profile 

The National Tuberculosis Institute owes its origin to the findings of a 1955-58 survey conducted by the Indian Council of Medical Research (ICMR) where high incidence of pulmonary tuberculosis was found across the country. Acting on the survey findings, the Government of India initiated actions to start an advanced research institute solely dedicated to the cause and, as a result, NTIB was established in 1959, on a property, Avalon, donated by the then Maharajah of Mysore. The technical assistance was provided by the World Health Organization and the Institute procured the equipment through UNICEF assistance.

The Institute has, ever since, been active in research projects and studies and has been successful in formulating a TB Control Program for the country which incorporates the clinical, epidemiological and sociological aspects of the disease. It is involved in activities such as training of medical and paramedical staff and personnel across the country, formulating policies and programs in accordance with the WHO recommended DOTS strategies, planning, coordinating and executing research on the disease and its epidemiology,  monitoring of programs, campaigns and impacts and documentation and dissemination of knowledge through print and audio-visual media.

The Institute was accredited as a WHO Collaborating Centre for TB research and training in 1985.

Programs

Training programs

The primary activity of the Training Department of the Institute is to train the medical and paramedical personnel, both as career-based and in-service courses, to groom them for training the staff working at the primary health centres and other lower strata medical facilities in the country. The course, Training of Trainers (TOT), is a two-week course, open to medical and paramedical personnel in the District Medical Centres and medical colleges.The other training courses offered by the Institute are:
 State TB Training and Demonstration Centre (STDC) Training: Three week course for STDC personnel such as Epidemiologists, Bacteriologists, Statisticians, TB specialists and trainers.
 RNTCP Modular Training: The course is designed as modular and is aimed at Senior Treatment Supervisors (STS) and Senior TB Laboratory Supervisors (STLS) and other training officers of the District Medical Centres.
 Training for Program Managers: Two week program for the Senior TB Officers (STO) and the Medical Officers (MO) aimed at developing the managerial and computer skills.
 Post graduate Training: 10-day program for the master's degree students in Community Medicine, Chest Medicine and General Medicine and the mode of training is through practicals and presentations.
 Training for NGOs and Private Practitioners: Two day course for private practitioners and NGOs as per recommendations from the State or Central TB Divisions.
 Training of WHO Fellows: This is a special program for WHO Fellows and is conducted on request and recommendation from WHO.

NTIB also conducts regular seminars, workshops and conference for easy dissemination of knowledge and information.

Research programs

NTIB undertakes research programs on a regular basis, two of the current programs are:

Capture-recapture to estimate incidence, periodic prevalence and completeness of Tuberculosis cases reporting under RNTCP in Tumkur district: The program aims to estimate the incidence and period prevalence of the disease in Tumkur district in Karnataka and arrive at the case finding efficiency of the Revised National Tuberculosis Control Program (RNTCP). The research methodology is based on capture-recapture method where the patient record is compared with various other data sources.

Challenges in implementation of diagnostic algorithm for patients having symptoms suggestive of pulmonary TB with smear negative report initial sputum examination: The project is focussed on preparing a database of smear test negative patients under RNTCP in the districts of Mysore, Mandya, Chikkamangalur and Shimoga, chart out the system and patient constraints and to document the behavioural patterns of the patients for preparing a diagnostic algorithm. The methodology deployed is random sampling and interview and comparison of the data with the lab registers maintained at the District Medical Centres (DMCs).

Monitoring programs
The monitoring program of NTIB covers the whole of India except the Union Territories of Daman and Diu and Lakshadweep under National Tuberculosis Programme (NTP) and Revised National Tuberculosis Programme (RNTCP). The program covers monitoring of data of smear positive and Smear negative case detections, sputum positive cases and treatment success rate.

Library
NTIB Library, established in 1960, is the knowledge repository of the Institute and acts as the Information Support Centre of the Institute and oversees the publications and the dissemination of information. It is accessible to the faculty and staff of the Institute, trainees, medical students, research scholars, health care providers, patients and public. The Library stocks 4,000 reference books and 10,000 bound volumes on Tuberculosis related topics such as Public Health, Radiology, Bacteriology, Statistics, Sociology, Epidemiology, Fugitive and Grey literature. It subscribes to 20 international and 35 national periodicals and has a collection of 120 audiovisual packages, 700 slides, 30 CDs and 150 transparencies, other than the NTIB publications.

Publications
NTIB has published many books, leaflets and journals related to Tuberculosis and its control mechanisms.
 
 
 
 
 
 
 
 
 
 

NTIB has also brought out several manuals, guides and other publications.

 Manual for Census Takers - 1960
 Manual for the BCG Vaccinator - 1960
 Manuals for the key personnel of District Tuberculosis Programme viz., Introduction, District Tuberculosis Officers, Treatment Organisers, Statistical Assistants, X ray Technicians and Peripheral Health Institutions - 1963
 Periodical Abstract Bulletin (for internal circulation only) - introduced from the year 1967
 Summaries of NTI studies Vol I & II 1976 & 1977
 Summaries of Tuberculosis Research Centre studies Vol I & II 1976 & 1977
 Report of the WHO-Government of India Workshop on Tuberculosis and Primary Health Care - 1981
 Establishment and functioning of a Tuberculosis Culture Laboratory - 1983
 NTI Souvenir - 1985
 Proceedings of the NTI Silver Jubilee Celebrations - 1985
 Tuberculosis: its diagnosis and treatment for lay persons - 1985
 Participation of General Medical Practitioners - a key to success of National Tuberculosis Programme - 1985
 Scientific Report 1980-89 - 1990
 Guidelines for Medical Officers of Peripheral Health Institutions on National Tuberculosis Programme – Chart - 1990
 Introduction to District Tuberculosis Programme - 1994
 Manual for District Tuberculosis Officers - 1994
 Manual for Treatment Organisers - 1994
 Manual for Laboratory Technicians - 1994
 Manual for Statistical Assistants - 1994
 Manual for X-ray Technicians - 1994
 Manual for Peripheral Health Institutions - 1994

See also

 Robert Koch
 World Tuberculosis Day
 Global Plan to Stop Tuberculosis

References

External links
 http://www.tbcindia.nic.in/rntcp.html

Ministry of Health and Family Welfare
Tuberculosis organizations
Research institutes in Bangalore
Medical research in India
Medical research institutes in India
Tuberculosis in India
1959 establishments in Mysore State
Research institutes established in 1959